The Asturian Wikipedia is the Asturian language edition of Wikipedia  started in July 2004. It has  edits. The Asturian Wikipedia ranks 16th among Wikipedias by articles per speaker population.

History

After its foundation in July 2004, the Asturian Wikipedia reached 1,000 articles on 1 September 2004.

In 2015, Wikipedia was awarded with the Spanish Princess of Asturias Award on International Cooperation. Speaking at the Asturian Parliament in Oviedo, the city that hosts the awards ceremony, Jimmy Wales praised the work of the Asturian language Wikipedia users. The night of the ceremony, members of the Wikimedia Foundation held a meeting with Wikipedians from all parts of Spain, including the local Asturian community.

References

External links

  The Asturian Wikipedia
  Asturian Wikipedia mobile version (not fully supported)

Wikipedias by language
Wikipedias in Romance languages
Asturian language
Science and technology in Spain
Spanish encyclopedias
Internet properties established in 2004